Colobocarpos is a monotypic plant genus of the family Euphorbiaceae. The sole species is Colobocarpos nanus. It is native to Laos and Northern Thailand.

References 

Codiaeae
Monotypic Euphorbiaceae genera
Flora of Laos
Flora of Thailand